

List of Ambassadors

Yoram Elron 2012-2015
Daniel Saada (Non-Resident, Jerusalem)2005 - 2011
Nicole Gad 2000 - 2003
Shlomo Avital 1990 - 1997
Acher Hakeny 1986 - 1990
Michael Michael (diplomat) 1982 - 1984
Haim Yaary 1967 - 1970
Ehud Avriel 1960

References 

Congo, Democratic
Israel